
Christian Gullager (March 1, 1759 – November 12, 1826) was a Danish-American artist specializing in portraits and theatrical scenery in the late 18th century. He worked in Boston, Massachusetts, New York, and Philadelphia.

Biography
Amandus Christian Gullager was born to Christian Guldager Prang and Marie Elisabeth Dalberg in Copenhagen. He  trained at the Royal Danish Academy of Fine Arts where he was awarded a silver medal in 1780. Gullager moved to Boston by 1786. In 1792, Gullager established a drawing academy at his house on Tremont Hill in Boston. Gullager worked in Newburyport in 1786, in Boston from 1789 to 1797, in New York City from 1797 to 1798, in Philadelphia  1798–1805, and in New York again in 1806–07. He died during 1826 in Philadelphia and was buried at the Second Presbyterian Church Yard, Third and Arch Streets.

Selected works
In America, portrait subjects included president George Washington. He designed scenery for Boston's Federal Street Theatre.

Gullager created portraits of:

 Joseph Ball
 Captain Offin Boardman, about 1787
 Benjamin Greenleaf Boardman, about 1787
 Sarah Greenleaf Boardman (Mrs. Offin Boardman) ca.1787
 Reverend Eli Forbes
 John May (1748–1812), 1789
 David Plumer
 Mary Sargent Plumer (Mrs. David Plumer) 
 Elizabeth Sewall Salisbury (Mrs. Samuel Salisbury), 1789
 Martha Saunders Salisbury (Mrs. Nicholas Salisbury), 1789
 Stephen Salisbury, 1789
 Daniel Waldo (1724–1808), 1789
 Rebecca Salisbury Waldo (Mrs. Daniel Waldo), 1789
 George Washington, 1789
 Abigail Leonard West (1796–1879), c. 1796
 David West, Jr. (1790–1825), c. 1796
 David West, Sr. (1765–1810), c. 1796
 Jeremiah Williams, ca.1780
 Mathilda Davis Williams, ca.1791

Image gallery

References

Further reading
 Christian Gullager, 1759–1826  (Worcester Art Museum) June 18–September 6, 1949.
 Christian Gullager: Portrait Painter to Federal America (National Portrait Gallery, Washington, D.C.)  April 23–September 20, 1976.

External links

 Historic New England. Gullager's portrait of Reverend Eli Forbes.

1759 births
1826 deaths
Artists from Boston
18th century in Boston
Danish portrait painters
American portrait painters
American scenic designers
1780s in the United States
1790s in the United States
Danish emigrants to the United States
Cultural history of Boston
Royal Danish Academy of Fine Arts alumni